The 1965 Wyoming Cowboys football team was an American football team that represented the University of Wyoming as a member of the Western Athletic Conference (WAC) during the 1965 NCAA University Division football season. In their fourth year under head coach Lloyd Eaton, the Cowboys compiled a 6–4 record (3–2 against conference opponents) and outscored opponents by a total of 201 to 182. They played their home games on campus at War Memorial Stadium in Laramie, Wyoming. They began a 22-game home winning streak, which lasted five seasons, until the opening game of the 1970 season.

Schedule

NFL Draft
Two Cowboys were selected in the 1966 NFL Draft, which lasted twenty rounds (305 selections).

References

Wyoming
Wyoming Cowboys football seasons
Wyoming Cowboys football